The Tour of Black Sea was a multi-day cycling race held in 2015, 2018 and 2019 in Turkey. It was part of the UCI Europe Tour as a category 2.2 race.

Winners

References

Cycle races in Turkey
2015 establishments in Turkey
Recurring sporting events established in 2015
2019 disestablishments in Turkey
Recurring sporting events disestablished in 2019
UCI Europe Tour races